Pilar Ruiz-Lapuente (born 1964, Barcelona) is an astrophysicist working as a professor at the University of Barcelona. Her work has included research on type Ia supernovae. In 2004, she led the team that searched for the companion star to the white dwarf that became supernova SN 1572, observed by Tycho Brahe, among others. Ruiz-Lapuente's research on supernovae contributed to the discovery of the accelerating expansion of the universe.

Career overview 

Ruiz-Lapuente completed her degree in Physics at the University of Barcelona, then did her doctoral studies at the University of Barcelona, the Max Planck Institute for Astrophysics, and the European Southern Observatory. She then went on to become a research fellow at the Center for Astrophysics  Harvard & Smithsonian. As of 2012, she was a professor with the Department of Astronomy and Meteorology at the University of Barcelona.

Research on accelerating universe 

Ruiz-Lapuente was one of the members of the Supernova Cosmology Project, one of two research teams which made the unexpected co-discovery, in 1998, that the universe was expanding at an accelerating rate. The teams discovered this by studying Type Ia supernovae and posited dark energy as an explanation for this accelerating expansion.

She said of her contribution to the work... 

As a result of this discovery, Ruiz-Lapuente, along with her colleagues on the Supernova Cosmology Project and the co-discoverers on the High-z Supernova Search Team, received the 2007 Gruber Prize in Cosmology and the 2015 Breakthrough Prize in Fundamental Physics. The research she contributed to also resulted in the awarding of a Nobel Prize to her team's lead researcher, Saul Perlmutter, which he shared with the High-z Supernova Search Team's directors.

Notable publications 

As of 2012, Pilar-Ruiz had authored more than 130 journal articles. These include works published in Nature and in Science.

Some articles include :

 Nebular spectra of type IA supernovae as probes for extragalactic distances, reddening, and nucleosynthesis 
 A possible low-mass type Ia supernova 
 Tycho Brahe's supernova: light from centuries past   
 Dark energy, gravitation and supernovae   

She has also written a book titled "El enigma de la realidad. Las entidades de la física de Aristóteles a Einstein."

References 

1964 births
Spanish astrophysicists
Living people
People from Barcelona
Academic staff of the University of Barcelona
20th-century Spanish scientists
Women astronomers
Women astrophysicists
University of Barcelona alumni
Spanish women scientists
20th-century Spanish women